Vucetich is a surname, a spelling variant of Vučetić. Notable people with the surname include:

Juan Vucetich (1858–1925), Croatian-born Argentine anthropologist and police official
Víctor Manuel Vucetich (born 1955), Mexican footballer and manager

See also
Vuchetich